The Bibi Hakimeh oil field is an oil field located in Bibi Hakimeh, Kohgiluyeh and Boyer-Ahmad Province, Iran. The field lies 210 kilometres (130 mi) southeast of Ahvaz. It was discovered in 1961, and it has produced oil since 1963. In 2018, it produced  of oil. The field is owned by state-owned National Iranian Oil Company (NIOC) and operated by National Iranian South Oil Company (NISOC).

See also

List of oil fields

References

Oil fields of Iran